Khushi or Kushi may refer to:

Arts and entertainment
Kushi (2000 film), Indian Tamil language film starring Vijay and Jyothika
Kushi (2001 film), the Indian Telugu remake starring Pawan Kalyan and Bhoomika Chawla
Khushi (2003 Hindi film), the Indian Hindi remake starring Fardeen Khan and Kareena Kapoor
Khushi (2003 Kannada film), Indian Kannada language film starring Vijay Raghavendra and Sindhu Menon
"Kushi" (song), 2006 song by Bombay Rockers

Places
Kushi (Mountains), a mountain in Pakistan
Kushi Armavir, a village and municipality in the Goygol Rayon of Azerbaijan
Kushi, Iran, a city in West Azerbaijan Province, Iran
Khushi District, a district in the East part of Logar Province, Afghanistan
Kushi Station, a train station in Ehime Prefecture, Japan

People
Michio Kushi (1926-2014), macrobiotics educator and founder of Kushi Institute
Andrea Kushi (1884–1959), Albanian painter
Feroze Khushi, English cricketer
Khushi Murali (1963–2013), Indian playback singer
Khushi Ram (1936–2013), Indian basketball player
Vojo Kushi, Albanian partisan

Other uses
Cushi, the traditional Hebrew word for a Cushite or a person of African origin
Kushi (skewer), skewers used in Japanese cuisine to hold and pierce food for grilling and frying, such as yakitori
Kushi language, a West Chadic language of Nigeria
Kushi (Utamaro), an ukiyo-e print by Kitagawa Utamaro,

See also
Kush (disambiguation)